The 1921-22 American Soccer League season was the inaugural season of the American Soccer League. Philadelphia F.C. finished on top of the season table.

History
By 1921, professionalism among American soccer teams was on the rise.  This created a disparity between fully professional, semi-professional and amateur teams competing in the same league.  As a result, several fully professional teams in both the National Association Football League and Southern New England Soccer League joined together to form the American Soccer League.  The new league was geographically limited to the area between Philadelphia and Boston.  On May 7, 1921, W. Luther Lewis was selected as the league's first president and he established the league headquarters at 126 Nassau Street, New York.  The league received approval from the United States Football Federation at its May 27, 1921, meeting and began its inaugural season in September.  Celtic F.C., aka the Jersey City Celtics, folded five games into the season and the Philadelphia F.C. won the league title.

League standings

Goals leaders

References

External links
American Soccer League I (RSSSF)
The Year in American Soccer - 1922

American Soccer League (1921–1933) seasons
1921–22 in American soccer